Romeo Watkins Lahey, M.B.E, (2 June 188726 October 1968) was an Australian businessman, civil servant and conservationist.

Early life
Romeo Watkins Lahey was born 2 June 1887 in Pimpama, Queensland, Australia. His father was David Lahey, an Irish-born farmer and timber miller, and his mother was Jane Jemima (née Walmsley), a homemaker. Lahey was one of twelve children, with three sisters and eight brothers: Frances Vida Lahey, Noel Alaric Lahey and Percival Ethelburt Lahey, Oswald Lahey, Jerome Lahey Jayne Lahey, Mavis Denholme (nee Lahey)

Education
Lahey received his education at Pimpama State school, Junction Park State School, Normal School and Brisbane Grammar School; his first job was as a clerk at AMP Limited. Lahey studied civil engineering at the University of Sydney. After World War I, he took up town planning at London University.

Career

A keen explorer, Lahey enjoyed roaming the forests with his spare time. His father, David Lahey, also one of Tamborine Shire Council's councillors, inspired Lahey to be a conservationist. He had exhibited a high degree of conservationism from a young age. Recognising the value in preserving the forests, he tirelessly campaigned, which resulted in the establishment of Lamington National Park in July 1915.

In April 1930, Lahey founded the National Parks Association of Queensland (NPAQ), where he served as president till his death in 1968. Lahey, NPAQ secretary Arthur Groom and a few supporters of theirs are credited for founding Queensland Holiday Resorts Limited and establishing Binna Burra Mountain Lodge, located next to Lamington National Park.

Lahey was appointed Member of the Most Excellent Order of the British Empire in 1960.

Military service
In World War I, he enlisted in the army, serving with the 3rd Divisional Engineers, initially attaining the rank of second lieutenant. He was promoted to lieutenant in January 1917. Lahey served on ship A29 HMAT Suevic. During World War II, Lahey served again in the army, ranking as a major.

Personal life
In 1919, after returning to Australia, Romeo Watkins Lahey married Sybil Delpratt, the youngest daughter of HJ Delpratt, in St John's Cathedral, Brisbane. They had three children: David, Alison and Ann.

Death
On 26 October 1968, Lahey died at his home in Yeronga, Brisbane, Queensland, Australia. He was cremated with Anglican rites.

Legacy 
In 1970, the Queensland Government opened a lookout named Kamurun in his memory at Lamington National Park.

References

External links
 

1887 births
1968 deaths
Australian Members of the Order of the British Empire
Businesspeople from Brisbane
People from the Gold Coast, Queensland
University of Sydney alumni